Siliana Governorate is one of the twenty-four governorates (provinces) of Tunisia, is landlocked and is in the north of the country. It covers an area of 4,631 km2 and has a population of 223,087 (2014 census). The capital is Siliana.

Geography
The province is coextensive with the upper Oued Siliana (Siliana river) catchment which flows north. The land includes a largely fertile valley, tributary valleys, and rocky and forested uplands. It generally slopes north. The south of the governorate tapers in a curve to include the three main peaks at the head of the valley in the dorsal Atlas Mountains. Shortly after leaving the governorate, the Oued Siliana feeds into the valley of the Medjerda River, which flows east. Two main settlements are beside the river: Siliana and Gaafour (Qa Afur). Two forested ridges form national parks mainly within and outside the north-west and south-east borders respectively. The higher of these is the Djebel Serj to the south east. The Siliana Barrage, below the city, is an artificial reservoir and is the largest lake in the province, followed by the Lakhmess Barrage in the south-east, which is less than a third of its size. The climate is more Mediterranean than desert, as it is near the coast (see Tunisia§Climate) with temperatures in all but the northern borders moderated by its high elevation.

Administrative divisions
Ten municipalities are in Siliana Governorate:

References

Governorates of Tunisia